The Polytechnic Marathon, often called the Poly, was a marathon held annually between 1909 and 1996, over various courses in or near London. It was the first marathon to be run regularly over the distance of 26 miles, 385 yards which is now the global standard. A total of eight world marathon bests were set in the Poly, including the first authenticated time under 2 hours, 20 minutes which had been regarded as the marathon equivalent of the four-minute mile. At the time of its demise in 1996, the Poly was Europe's oldest regular marathon. It had seen more world records and had been run over  more often than any other marathon.

Origin
The Polytechnic Marathon had its origins in the marathon of the 1908 Summer Olympics, held in London. This race was organised by the Polytechnic Harriers, the athletics club of the London Polytechnic at Regent Street (now the University of Westminster). The Polytechnic Harriers decided to start the Olympic marathon in front of the Royal apartments at Windsor Castle and end it on the track at White City Stadium in front of the Royal Box, a distance that turned out to be 26 miles, 385 yards.

There was immense public interest in the 1908 Olympic race, with its dramatic finish in which Dorando Pietri of Italy entered the stadium well clear of the field and staggered around the last lap to the finish line—only to be disqualified for receiving assistance. Building on this interest, The Sporting Life newspaper offered a magnificent trophy for an annual international marathon that would be second in importance only to the Olympic event itself. The Polytechnic Harriers were again asked to organise the event, and the Polytechnic Marathon was born.

Early races
The first Polytechnic Marathon was held on 8 May 1909. Henry Barrett won, followed by Fred Lord, and Harry Green.

As with the Olympic race, the start was at Windsor Castle and the course was 26 miles, 385 yards; this distance was adopted as the international standard for marathons in 1924. (The older Boston Marathon, founded in 1897, adopted the  distance in 1924, but was slightly short for the first three years and was shorter still from 1951 to 1956.)

Over the years, the route of the Poly Marathon varied. From 1909 until 1932, it ended at Stamford Bridge in west London; then in 1933, it moved back to the White City stadium, where the 1908 Olympic marathon had finished. From 1938, the race ended at the new Polytechnic Harriers stadium in Chiswick, west London. It was on this course that Jim Peters, the greatest marathoner of his day, broke the 2 hours and 20 minutes barrier in 1953. Even more remarkably, remeasurement showed the course to have been about 150 yards too long.

In 1961, The Sporting Life withdrew its sponsorship, having ceased to report on athletics. A new sponsor was found in the form of confectionery company Callard and Bowser; and in the next few years, the race went from strength to strength, with a succession of world records (see table).

Decline and fall
By 1970, the Polytechnic Harriers and the Poly Marathon were in decline. Traffic problems made it difficult to continue with the Windsor-to-Chiswick route, and from 1973 until 1992, the race was restricted to the Windsor area. Performances declined, and so did the status of the Poly Marathon. With the introduction of mass marathons and big-money events elsewhere, the Poly Marathon could not compete.

There were organizational changes, too. In 1985, the Polytechnic Harriers merged with Kingston AC and moved in with them at Kingsmeadow Stadium in Kingston, Surrey. Some ex-Polytechnic Harriers remained at the Polytechnic sports ground in Hartington Road, Chiswick, where they formed a new club—West 4 Harriers—which was to become involved with the Polytechnic Marathon some years later.

Management of the race passed to the London Road Runners Club (LRRC) for 1986 and 1987, but the LRRC then folded. After a four-year gap, the race was revived in 1992 by Capital Road Runners (an even shorter-lived successor to LRRC) in conjunction with West 4 Harriers. A revised route was introduced, from Windsor to the Polytechnic stadium at Chiswick, recalling the event's former glory days.

From 1993 to 1995, the Poly Marathon was organised by a group from West 4 Harriers. In 1996, responsibility passed to a commercial events organiser, but increased traffic and other difficulties made it impossible to keep the race going beyond 1996.

World records set in the Polytechnic Marathon

Note 1: Date wrongly given as 26 May in some sources.
Note 2: Distance measured as 42.337 km.

References

External links

 Kingston AC & Polytechnic Harriers website
 The Polytechnic Marathon 1909–1996 by Ian Ridpath (race director 1993–95)
 University of Westminster archives

Marathons in the United Kingdom
Athletics in London
1996 disestablishments in England
1909 establishments in England
Recurring sporting events established in 1909
Recurring sporting events disestablished in 1996
Windsor, Berkshire